Reece Kelly is an Irish cricketer. He made his first-class debut for the North West Warriors in the 2017 Inter-Provincial Championship on 30 August 2017. In December 2017, he was named in Ireland's squad for the 2018 Under-19 Cricket World Cup.

References

Living people
Year of birth missing (living people)
Irish cricketers
North West Warriors cricketers